The 2001 Dubai Tennis Championships and Dubai Duty Free Women's Open were tennis tournaments played on outdoor hard courts at the Aviation Club Tennis Centre in Dubai in the United Arab Emirates that were part of the International Series Gold of the 2001 ATP Tour and of Tier II of the 2001 WTA Tour. The men's tournament was held from February 26 through March 4, 2001 while the women's tournament was held from February 19 through February 24, 2001. Juan Carlos Ferrero and Martina Hingis won the singles titles.

Finals

Men's singles

 Juan Carlos Ferrero defeated  Marat Safin 6–2, 3–1 (Safin retired)
 It was Ferrero's 1st title of the year and the 2nd of his career.

Women's singles

 Martina Hingis defeated  Nathalie Tauziat 6–4, 6–4
 It was Hingis' 3rd title of the year and the 70th of her career.

Men's doubles

 Joshua Eagle /  Sandon Stolle defeated  Daniel Nestor /  Nenad Zimonjić 6–4, 6–4
 It was Eagle's only title of the year and the 2nd of his career. It was Stolle's 2nd title of the year and the 18th of his career.

Women's doubles

 Yayuk Basuki /  Caroline Vis defeated  Åsa Carlsson /  Karina Habšudová 6–0, 4–6, 6–2
 It was Basuki's only title of the year and the 15th of her career. It was Vis' only title of the year and the 9th of her career.

External links
 Official website
 ATP Tournament Profile
 WTA Tournament Profile

 
2001
Dubai Tennis Championships
Dubai Duty Free Women's Open